F. H. Faulding & Co was a pharmaceutical company founded in Adelaide, Australia, in 1845 by Francis Hardey Faulding (23 August 1816 – 19 November 1868), a native of Swinefleet, near Goole in Yorkshire, son of Francis Faulding, a surgeon.

History
Francis Hardey Faulding arrived in Sydney on the Nabob in February 1842, in the midst of an economic slump. He travelled on the brig Dorset to Adelaide in May, where he weathered the slump, and opened a pharmacy at 5 Rundle Street on 9 May 1845. Around this time he had an assistant, Joseph Bosisto, who in 1851 left for Melbourne, where he famously explored the commercial value of eucalyptus oils as an antiseptic, and was in 1874 elected MLA for Richmond.

The pharmacy flourished, so he purchased a warehouse in Clarence Place in the city and transferred the manufacturing and wholesale arms of the business there.
In 1861 he entered into partnership with Luther Scammell (1826–1910). Scammell, also a Yorkshireman, had received medical training at Guy's Hospital and arrived in Adelaide in 1849 to practice in the Burra mines, then subsequently set up business in Port Adelaide.

Faulding had numerous other interests: In 1847 he was one of the founders of the South Australian Institute (another was business competitor William Bickford (1815–1850)). On 16 December 1864 he was elected councillor for the Hindmarsh ward of the Adelaide City Council. He was a director of the Bank of Adelaide and trustee of the Savings Bank of South Australia. He was also an active member of the South Australian Free Rifle Corps.

On 16 September 1852 he married Eliza Macgeorge at her home "Urr Brae" later "Urrbrae", the famous home of Peter Waite. (His sister Eliza (1824 – 2 February 1907) had married Thomas Waterhouse a week previously.) In 1857 they left the residence on Stephens Place corner of North Terrace for an extended stay in England. He died without issue in 1868, aged 52 at his mansion "Wooton Lea" near Glen Osmond. On 1 December 1869 the widowed Eliza Faulding married family friend Anthony Forster but they divorced six years later.

Scammell became sole owner on the founder's death in 1868. He immediately appointed Philip Dakers as the company's London buyer, and in 1876 built a prominent warehouse in King William Street later expanding to James Place which became the front office address. He was forced to retire in 1889 when the Bank of Adelaide threatened foreclosure after a series of failed mining and pastoral speculations. Two of his sons, Luther Robert Scammell FCS LSA (20 March 1858 – 8 April 1940) and William J. Scammell (26 October 1856 – 19 April 1928) acquired the manufacturing and wholesaling operations, and the business name, in 1888; the retail shops were sold to John White to reduce the debt to the bank.

Scammell Snr. was also involved in politics and, with Thomas Hardy and Sir Samuel Davenport, was a pioneer of South Australia's olive oil industry, producing its first oil in 1864.

The company expanded under the two brothers. In 1890 they founded a branch in rented premises in Perth, and from 1894 under the management of Walter Wesley Garner, it thrived and expanded, later setting up a warehouse and laboratory in Murray Street. A Sydney branch was founded in 1899 in O'Connell Street under J. P. Gold, and in Newcastle under J. P. F. Gwynne. Later W. J. Scammell took charge and a factory was built in Redfern.

Alfred F. Scammell & R.G. Scammell (sons of L.R. Scammell), and Rupert Boswood Scammell & George Vance Scammell (b. 1903) (sons of W.J. Scammell), became directors of the company, the latter two at the Sydney branch. The former two moved to Sydney in 1911.

In June 1921 Faulding & Co. became a private company, with L.R. Scammell as chairman and managing director. He continued to run the firm's affairs until 1935. Day-to-day management then passed to his elder son Alfred, but Luther remained chairman of directors until his death in 1940.

In 1971 Faulding's purchased Jasol Chemical Products, an Adelaide manufacturer of unsophisticated but effective and popular sterilising and cleaning agents.

Dr. Ed Tweddell was appointed managing director in 1988 and entered into a joint venture with CSIRO to develop new drugs under Keating government's "Factor f" scheme, and later the Pharmaceutical Industry Investment Program. In 1999, Fauldings were promised $40 million in federal funding over five years in return for industry development. Faulding Pharmaceuticals expanded its northern hemisphere operations and in 2001 the Mayne Nickless group (as Mayne Pharma) took over the company, whereupon Tweddell resigned from the board. Mayne Pharma was bought out in 2007 by the US Hospira conglomerate, which in turn was acquired by Pfizer in 2015. Despite initially announcing plans to invest in the manufacturing facility at Thebarton in 2016, In February 2017 the corporation announced its intention to close it by the end of 2021.

Manufacturing and laboratory facilities
Two of the Faulding company's major innovations were the development of a process for distillation of eucalyptus oil, and the development of the test for determining the eucalyptol content of the oil. Faulding's success was founded on eucalyptus oil, which formed the basis of an antiseptic marketed as "Solyptol" (for soluble eucalyptus oil). The test became the industry standard, and the British Pharmacopoeia standard method in 1898. Other well-known products were Milk Emulsion (a pleasant alternative to cod-liver oil), Solyptol Soap, (which won a gold medal at the Franco-British Exhibition in London in 1908), Solyptol disinfectant, junket tablets, cordials, essential oils for perfumery and reagents such as Epsom salts, most produced in its factory in Thebarton on the land once occupied by Bean Brothers' tannery. In 1962 Fauldings were listed as having factories and laboratories in the area bounded by Holland St, Winwood St, Reid St and Beans Rd (now Dew St), Thebarton.

Faulding's Journal
From 1906 to 1919, a monthly magazine Faulding's Journal was published covering a similar range of topics to today's New Scientist. The editor was prominent journalist W.J.P. Giddings.

X-ray experiments
In 1896, Samuel Barbour, Faulding's chief chemist, and W. T. Rowe, who had studied at Adelaide University under Sir William Bragg experimented with an X-ray tube brought back from England by Barbour. The first results were rather modest as the induction coil used was only capable of a two-inch spark (around 50kV?). Much higher energies were achieved when they borrowed a twelve-inch spark unit (around 190kV) from Sir Charles Todd. Rowe ran the X-ray clinic for Fauldings in 1896 and 1897 when Barbour sold the unit to Sir Joseph Verco.

Dental, veterinary and scientific products
Faulding acted as manufacturers' agents for such equipment as dental appliances and chairs as well as stocking hundreds of thousands of artificial teeth.
They also sold a wide range of scientific glassware and laboratory equipment.

Bibliography
A Century of Medical Progress 1845–1945 F.H. Faulding & Co. Ltd, Adelaide 1945
Camel, L.R. A History of F.H. Faulding & Co. Ltd 1931
Donovan, Peter; Tweddell, Ed The Faulding Formula. A History of F.H. Faulding & Co. Ltd. Wakefield Press, South Australia 1995

References

 
Pharmaceutical companies of Australia
Pharmaceutical companies established in 1845
Manufacturing companies based in Adelaide
History of Adelaide